Sonam Gyatso Lepcha is an Indian politician from Sikkim. He is a member of the Sikkim Democratic Front. He was elected to the Sikkim Legislative Assembly from Djongu in the 2019 Sikkim Legislative Assembly election as a member of the Sikkim Krantikari Morcha. He has won this seat since 1999.

References

1962 births
Living people
Sikkim Sangram Parishad politicians
Sikkim Democratic Front politicians
People from Gangtok
Sikkim MLAs 2019–2024
Lepcha people